On 12 December 2022, insurgents attacked a hotel popular with foreigners in Kabul, Afghanistan. At least three civilians were killed. Eighteen others, including foreigners, are reported to be among those injured. Islamic State – Khorasan Province claimed responsibility for the attack.

Background
The Islamic State–Taliban conflict began in 2015; since then they have often attacked Kabul. In September 2022, a suicide bomber blew himself up outside the Russian Embassy in Kabul, killing two Russian diplomats. In early December, gunmen attacked the Pakistani ambassador at his embassy compound in Kabul, wounding a Pakistani guard. On 11 December, Chinese ambassador to Afghanistan Wang Yu met Afghan Deputy Foreign minister Sher Mohammad Abbas Stanikzai to discuss security matters, and called on the Taliban "to pay more attention to the security of the Chinese Embassy in Kabul."

Attack
Around 14:30 local time on 12 December 2022, insurgents attacked the Kabul Longan Hotel in Afghanistan. Residents reported hearing a powerful explosion followed by gunfire.

Victims
3 people were killed and 18 injured. Taliban spokesman Zabiullah Mojahid confirmed the attack ended with all three gunmen killed, and hotel guests were evacuated. Chinese Foreign Ministry spokesperson Zhao Lijian said that five Chinese nationals were among the injured.

Responsibility
On 13 December 2022, jihadist group Islamic State-Khorasan Province claimed responsibility for the attack in a Telegram post. The IS statement claimed the hotel was attacked because the hotel is frequented by diplomats and is owned by "communist China" . The Islamic State has a history of opposition to the Chinese government in relation to the Uyghur Muslim genocide, and has been critical of the Taliban for its willingness to cooperate with China. The statement claimed the attackers detonated pre-planted explosives and set fire to the building.

See also
 List of terrorist attacks in Kabul

References

Hotel attack
2022 murders in Afghanistan
2020s building bombings
2020s crimes in Kabul
21st-century mass murder in Afghanistan
Attacks on buildings and structures in 2022
Building bombings in Kabul
December 2022 events in Afghanistan
Improvised explosive device bombings in 2022
ISIL terrorist incidents in Afghanistan
Murder in 2022
Murder in Kabul
Terrorist incidents in Afghanistan in 2022